Paul Chamberlin (born March 26, 1962) is a former professional tennis player from the United States.

Chamberlin won one doubles title (1989, Bristol) during his career.  After playing college tennis at the University of Arizona, the right-hander reached his highest ATP singles ranking of World No. 46 in January 1990.

Chamberlin made the quarterfinals at Wimbledon in 1989, beating Gary Muller, Thomas Högstedt, Nick Fulwood and Leif Shiras before losing to eventual champion Boris Becker.

ATP career finals

Singles: 1 (1 runner-up)

Doubles: 2 (1 title, 1 runner-up)

ATP Challenger and ITF Futures finals

Doubles: 1 (1–0)

Performance timelines

Singles

Doubles

External links
 
 

1962 births
American male tennis players
Arizona Wildcats men's tennis players
Living people
Sportspeople from Toledo, Ohio
Tennis people from Ohio